The 1989 European Competition for Women's Football final was an association football match on 2 July 1989 at Fritz-Walter-Stadion in Osnabrück, West Germany, to determine the winner of 1989 European Competition for Women's Football.

Background

Germany

Germany defeated Italy via a penalty shootout in the semi finals to reach the final.

Match

Summary

Germany won against Norway 4-1.

Final

References

External links
Official tournament website

Final
1989
Sport in Osnabrück
1989
1989